Orsellinaldehyde is a dihydroxybenzaldehyde with a methyl side group. It can be classified as a resorcinol, benzaldehyde or toluene derivative. It is a natural product of several fungi. Fungi that contain it include Grifola frondosa, Aspergillus cleistominutus, Aspergillus nidulans, and Agrocybe praecox.

Production
Orsellinaldehyde can be produced by a Gattermann reaction of orcinol, using zinc cyanide under a hydrogen chloride atmosphere, which adds an aldimine (-CH=NH) group to the ring, followed by hydrolysis to give the aldehyde.

Properties
The melting point is between 181 and 183 °C.

References

Alkylresorcinols
Hydroxybenzaldehydes
Secondary metabolites